This list of heritage buildings in Dreschvitz includes all historic buildings in the municipality of Dreschvitz and its incorporated villages. Dreschvitz lies in the county of Vorpommern-Rügen in northeast Germany.

Dreschvitz

Güttin

Landow

Pagelsdorf

Ralow

Rugenhof

Sources 
 List of heritage buildings in the County of Vorpommern-Rügen

Dreschvitz
Vorpommern-Rügen
Culture of Mecklenburg-Western Pomerania
Dreschvitz
Mecklenburg-Western Pomerania-related lists
Lists of buildings and structures in Germany